Dressing for Pleasure is an album by Jon Hassell that was released by Warner Bros. on November 14, 1994.

Track listing

"Destination: Bakiff" contains a sample of "Bakiff" performed by Duke Ellington (cf. The Blanton–Webster Band).

Personnel
Credits adapted from liner notes.

Musicians
 Jon Hassell – trumpet (on all tracks exc. 3, 4, 8), keyboards (tracks 5–9, 12), voice (7, 11)
 Pete Scaturro - Hammond organ (1), piano (2), drum machine (3), keyboard bass (3, 4, 8, 9), electric bass (11)
 Brain - drums, percussion (on all exc. 3, 13)
 Joe Gore - guitar (2, 5, 7–10, 12, 13)
 BLK Lion - keyboard samples, programming (1, 3, 5, 7, 8, 12)
with
 Jamie Muhoberac - synthesizer, keyboard samples (tracks 1, 2, 12)
 Kenny Garrett - saxophone (1, 3)
 Flea - electric bass (1)
 Trevor Dunn - acoustic bass (2, 12)
 Leslie Winer - voice (4)
 DJ Grand Shogun KB - scratches (4)
 Islam Shabazz - electric bass (7, 9), voice (7)
 Lee Curreri - programming, organ treatment (7)
 Gregg Arreguin - guitar (6)
 Buckethead - electric bass (10)
 Zoë Ellis - vocals (11)
 Greg Kurstin - piano (11)
 Peter Freeman – electric bass (13)
 Adam Rudolph - drums, percussion (13)

Technical personnel
 Jon Hassell – production
 Pete Scaturro - production, recording and mixing engineer, additional recording (7)
 Lee Curreri - co-production, recording (7)
 BLK Lion - co-production (7)
 Stephen Marcussen - mastering
 Kevin Laffey - executive producer
 Jon Hassell - art direction, cover design, Bluescreen concept and video still lifes
 Tom Recchion - art direction and cover design
 Katherine Delaney - cover design
 F. Scott Schafer - photography (band)

References

External links
 

1994 albums
Jon Hassell albums